The Definitive Pop Collection is the seventh compilation album by American pop rock duo Sonny & Cher, released in 2006 by Rhino Records.

Album information
It was released in 2006 and didn't enter in album charts.

The Definitive Pop Collection contains Sonny and Cher's hit songs from the 60's, including "I Got You Babe" and "The Beat Goes On". It also contains Cher solo songs, like her successes "All I Really Want To Do", "Bang Bang (My Baby Shot Me Down)", and "You Better Sit Down Kids" and Bono solo songs like "Laugh At Me" and "My Best Friend's Girl Is Out of Sight".

All songs come from their late 60's studio albums, compilation and soundtrack. This compilation also contains songs released only on singles. Unlike the earliest compilation, it contains their first hit "Baby Don't Go" released on label Reprise Records.

Track listing

Disc: 1
"I Got You Babe" (Sonny Bono) – 3:11
"Baby Don't Go" (S. Bono) – 3:09
"All I Really Want To Do" (Bob Dylan) – 2:59
"Just You" (S. Bono) – 3:36
"Sing C'est La Vie" (S. Bono, Green, Stone) – 3:39
"The Letter" (Harrys, Terry) – 2:09
"Laugh At Me" (S. Bono) - 2:50
"But You're Mine" (S. Bono) - 3:02
"The Revolution Kind" (S. Bono) - 3:25
"Why Don't They Let Us Fall in Love" (P. Spector, E. Greenwich, J. Barry) – 2:29
"It's Gonna Rain" (S. Bono) – 2:23
"What Now My Love" (Carl Sigman, Gilbert Bécaud, Pierre Delanoë) - 3:28
"I Look For You" (S. Bono) - 2:40
"Have I Stayed Too Long" (S. Bono) - 3:42
"Leave Me Be" (Chris White) - 2:03
"So Fine" (Johnny Otis) - 2:30

Disc: 2
"The Beat Goes On" (Sonny Bono) - 3:27
"Bang Bang (My Baby Shot Me Down)"  (S. Bono) 2:50
"Little Man" (S. Bono) - 3:20
"Monday" (S. Bono) - 2:55
"Living For You" (S. Bono) - 3:30
"Love Don't Come" (S. Bono) - 3:05
"Cheryl's Goin' Home" (Bob Lind) - 2:40
"A Beautiful Story" (S. Bono) - 2:52
"Plastic Man" (S. Bono) - 3;34
"It's the Little Things" (S. Bono) - 3:05
"Don't Talk to Strangers" (S. Bono) - 2:46
"My Best Friend's Girl Is Out of Sight" (S. Bono) 4:13
"You Better Sit Down Kids" (S. Bono) - 3:47
"Good Combination" (Barkan) 2:57

Credits

Personnel
Main vocals: Cher
Main vocals: Sonny Bono

References

2006 greatest hits albums
Sonny & Cher albums
Rhino Records compilation albums